Shaoguan University (abbreviated as SGU) is a public university based in Shaoguan, Guangdong, China.

References

External links
 Shaoguan University 
 

Universities and colleges in Guangdong
Educational institutions established in 1958
1958 establishments in China
Buildings and structures in Shaoguan